Feuz is a surname. Notable people with the surname include:

 Beat Feuz (born 1987), Swiss ski racer
 Ernst Feuz (1908–1988), Swiss ski jumper
 Fritz Feuz (born 1931), Swiss gymnast